Rudy Porter (born 15 December 2000) is an Australian racing cyclist, who currently rides for UCI WorldTeam . On 25 July 2022 it was announced Rudy would ride for UCI WorldTeam  in 2023.

Major results
Sources:
2020
 9th Overall Herald Sun Tour
2021
 2nd Road race, National Under-23 Road Championships
 10th Overall Tour Alsace
2022
 2nd Overall Course de la Paix U23 – Grand Prix Jeseníky
 4th Overall Alpes Isère Tour
 4th Overall Santos Festival of Cycling

References

External links
 

2000 births
Living people
Australian male cyclists